Paškevičius is a Lithuanian-language surname from the Belarusian surname Pashkevich, which ultimately comes from the East Slav personal name Pashka, a diminutive of  Pavel (Paul). Notable people with this surname include:

 (Aldona Liobytė-Paškevičienė, 1915–1985),  award-winning Lithuanian children's author, playwright, translator and actress
 (1843-1914),  Russian Imperial army general in medicine, activist of Lithuanian cultural society  Rūta 
Marius Paškevičius (born 1979), Lithuanian judoka
Ona Dokalskaitė-Paškevičienė (1912-2007), Lithuanian painter

References

Lithuanian-language surnames